Gyeon Singeom (? – September 936, r. 15 November 935 – 936) was the second and final king of Hubaekje, one of the Later Three Kingdoms of Korea.  He came to the throne after conspiring with his two brothers, Yanggeom and Yonggeom, to overthrow their father Gyeon Hwon and kill the anointed heir, their younger half-brother Geumgang.

The brothers placed Gyeon Hwon in prison, but he was able to escape. Gyeon Hwon led the Goryeo army against them in 936 AD at present-day Seonsan in Gumi city, destroying Singeom's army.

King Taejo of Goryeo deemed that the plot was the work of Singeom's brothers, and granted Singeom a noble title. Accounts vary as to whether Yanggeom and Yonggeom were sent into exile or slain.

See also 
History of Korea

References

Korean rulers
936 deaths
10th-century rulers in Asia
Year of birth unknown
Monarchs taken prisoner in wartime